Neil Rigby is an English former professional rugby league footballer, who played professionally for St. Helens in the Super League before leaving for his current, Championship 1 team Swinton Lions. He signed professionally for St Helens from Blackbrook Royals ARLFC. He made his only first-grade appearance in St Helens' 2006's Super League XI 26-22 defeat away to Catalans Dragons in 2006, where St Helens played a mostly reserve team, resting many of the first-team players who would play in the Challenge Cup final. He came on off the bench. He left St Helens at the end of this season for Swinton, where he currently plays as a semi-professional.
He left Swinton and coaches an amateur team called Thatto Heath Crusaders.

References

External links
Saints Heritage Society profile

1986 births
Living people
English rugby league players
Rugby articles needing expert attention
Rugby league players from St Helens, Merseyside
Rugby league props
St Helens R.F.C. players
Swinton Lions players